Ian Daniel Vander-Wal (born 22 September 1971) is an Australian former sprint and middle-distance freestyle swimmer who represented Australia at the 1996 Summer Olympics in Atlanta. He was a member of the 4x100-metre and 4x200-metre freestyle relay teams.  He trained at the Commercial Swimming Club in Brisbane.

He also competed at the 1997 Pan Pacific Swimming Championships in Fukuoka, Japan, where he combined with Michael Klim, Grant Hackett and Ian Thorpe to earn a silver medal in the 4x200-metre freestyle relay.  He was an Australian Institute of Sport scholarship holder from 1989 to 1992.

See also
 List of Commonwealth Games medallists in swimming (men)

References

1971 births
Living people
Australian people of Dutch descent
People from Darwin, Northern Territory
Olympic swimmers of Australia
Australian male freestyle swimmers
Swimmers at the 1996 Summer Olympics
Sportsmen from the Northern Territory
Australian Institute of Sport swimmers
Commonwealth Games medallists in swimming
Commonwealth Games gold medallists for Australia
Swimmers at the 1990 Commonwealth Games
Medallists at the 1990 Commonwealth Games